The Criș Collector Canal is the main canal of the drainage system of the area between the Crișul Repede and the Crișul Negru in Bihor County, western Romania. The lower reach of the canal is also known as Tămașda Collector Canal.

The canal starts from the Crișul Repede near the village of Tărian, 10 km west of Oradea, and flows into the Crișul Negru upstream of the village of Tămașda. The canal intercepts the drainage canals and the rivers flowing westward between the two main rivers, including Corhana, Velju Mare and Veljul Negreștilor. It passes through the villages Tărian, Toboliu, Roit, Sânnicolau Român, Cefa, Homorog, Arpășel, Ghiorac, Boiu and Tămașda.

References

Canals in Romania
CCris Collector Canal
CCris Collector Canal